A donkey show is a type of live sex show in which a woman engages in bestiality with a donkey, which, according to urban legend and some works of fiction, were once performed in the Mexican border city of Tijuana, particularly in the mid-20th century.

Gustavo Arellano, in his Ask a Mexican column, argues that such donkey shows are not real.

As late as 2008, they have been mentioned as a reason to visit Tijuana, and naive tourists may seek them out.

In popular culture
The "donkey show" has been portrayed or alluded to in several American films, including Losin' It (1983), Bachelor Party (1984), The 40-Year Old Virgin (2005), Clerks II (2006), The Heartbreak Kid (2007), and Cake (2014).  It also gives its name and theme to The Donkey Show, a musical version of A Midsummer Night's Dream that climaxes with Bottom (two women in a donkey suit) lowering the crotch area onto the pelvis area of Titania, who wears only boots, a thong, and butterfly pasties. A donkey show is also a minor plot element in the House episode "It's a Wonderful Lie" in which the title character diagnoses a prostitute as part of his clinic duties. 

In 2005, the term is claimed to be used to describe a situation that has become a "complete mess", for example the government and the news media outlets.

See also
 Ping pong show

References

Zoophilia
Donkeys
Sex industry
Tijuana
Sexual urban legends